Wester Moffat Hospital is a health facility in Towers Road, Airdrie, North Lanarkshire, Scotland. It is managed by NHS Lanarkshire. It is a Grade B listed building.

History
The building, which was designed by Charles Wilson in the Scottish baronial style for William Towers-Clark, a solicitor, was completed in 1862. It was converted for medical use and re-opened as a sanatorium in January 1929. The facility joined the National Health Service in 1948. Rifleman James Morris, a soldier from the Cameronians (Scottish Rifles), was admitted to the hospital after a car crash in 1962 and spent 54 years there without recovering before his death in 2017.

References

1929 establishments in Scotland
Hospitals established in 1929
Hospital buildings completed in 1862
NHS Scotland hospitals
Hospitals in North Lanarkshire
NHS Lanarkshire